Cilcain Hall is a country house  north-northeast of the village of Cilcain, Flintshire, Wales.  It was built in 1875–77 for W. B. Buddicom and designed by the Chester architect John Douglas.  The hall is built in stone and has a red tile roof.  Its architecture includes Elizabethan elements.  Douglas also designed an entrance lodge which was built around the same time on the main road.  The lodge is no longer present.

References

Houses in Flintshire
Houses completed in 1877
John Douglas buildings
1877 establishments in Wales